Nuclear Power School (NPS) is a technical school operated by the U.S. Navy in Goose Creek, South Carolina as a central part of a program that trains enlisted sailors, officers, KAPL civilians and Bettis civilians for shipboard nuclear power plant operation and maintenance of surface ships and submarines in the U.S. nuclear navy.
As of 2020 the United States Navy operates 98 nuclear power plants, including 71 submarines (each with one reactor), 11 aircraft carriers (each with two reactors), and three Moored Training Ships (MTS) and two land-based training plants.
NPS is the centerpiece of the training pipeline for U.S. Navy nuclear operators. It follows initial training at Nuclear Field "A" School (for enlisted operators) or a college degree (for officer operators and a small number of civilian contractors), and culminates with certification as a nuclear operator at one of the Navy's two Nuclear Power Training Units (NPTU). As of 2020, since training the crew of the first nuclear powered vessel in 1952, the Program has trained and qualified over 142,000 nuclear propulsion plant operators. Since 1955, when Nautilus first got underway on nuclear power, Navy nuclear powered vessels have safely steamed over 166 million miles.

Overview 

Prospective enlisted enrollees in the Nuclear Power Program must have qualifying line scores on the ASVAB exam, may need to pass the NFQT (Nuclear Field Qualification Test), and must undergo a NACLC investigation for attaining a "Secret" security clearance. Additionally, each applicant must pass an interview with the Advanced Programs Coordinator in the associated recruiting district.

All officer students have had college-level courses in calculus and calculus-based physics. Acceptance to the officer program requires successful completion of interviews at Naval Reactors in Washington, D.C., and a final approval via a direct interview with the Director, Naval Nuclear Propulsion, a unique eight-year, four-star admiral position which was originally held by the program's founder, Admiral Hyman G. Rickover.

Women were allowed into the Naval Nuclear Field from 1978 until 1980, when the Navy began only allowing men again. With the repeal of the Combat Exclusion Law in the 1994 Defense Authorization Act, and the decision to open combatant ships to women, the Navy once again began accepting women into NNPS for duty aboard nuclear-powered surface combatant ships. In 2010 the Navy lifted the ban on women on submarines, and one year later the first female officers reported for the first time onboard US Navy Submarines. The first female enlisted sailors reported onboard submarines in 2015. In November 2015, the first female Reactor Officer, Commander Erica L. Hoffmann, took leadership of Reactor Department onboard . CVN Reactor Officer is the most senior shipboard nuclear officer position in the Navy, with a pre-requisite of completing a commanding officer tour on board a non-nuclear surface ship before the officer can receive a Reactor Officer assignment.

Following graduation from Boot Camp, enlisted personnel proceed to Nuclear Field "A" School for training in rating as Machinist's Mate (MMN), Electrician's Mate (EMN), or Electronics Technician (ETN). Active duty obligation is six years. Applicants must enlist for four years and concurrently execute an agreement to extend their enlistment for 24 months to accommodate the additional training involved. Personnel in the Nuclear Field program will be enlisted in paygrade E-3. Advancement to paygrade E-4 is authorized only after personnel complete all advancement-in-rate requirements (to include minimum time in rate) and Class "A" School, provided eligibility in the Nuclear Field program is maintained. If Nuclear Field Class "A" School training is not completed, the member will be administratively reduced to E-2 or E-1, depending on the member's time in rate at the date of disenrollment. Upon acceptance of automatic advancement to paygrade E-4, the member will be obligated for 12-months of the two-year extension, in addition to the four-year enlistment, regardless of whether or not advanced training (i.e. NPS/NPTU) is completed. 
They then continue to Nuclear Power School for an additional six months of College level classroom instruction. Graduates of the Nuclear Power School proceed to an additional six months of training at a Nuclear Power Training Unit (NPTU). This training involves the operation and maintenance of nuclear reactor plants and steam plants. Graduates of NPTU are qualified as nuclear operators, and most graduates immediately receive assignments to serve on submarines and aircraft carriers in the fleet. Upon completion of training at NPS and NPTU, the sailor is obligated to the remaining 12 months of the two year extension resulting in a total of six years active duty obligation for those who complete the program.

A few students from each NPTU class are selected as a Junior Staff Instructor (JSI) based on top academic performance throughout the program, evaluation for aptitude to be an instructor, and willingness to incur an additional 24 month service obligation (for a total of eight years on active duty). JSIs receive additional instructor training at the NPTU and then train students themselves for 24 months before eventually continuing on to serve in the fleet. Additionally, a few MMN graduates from each NPTU class are selected to undergo further training in the Engineering Laboratory Technician (ELT) specialty. ELTs are responsible for collection, analysis, and controls of reactor plant and steam generator water chemistry, as well as radiological analysis and controls. Upon completion of ELT training graduates are given assignments to the fleet.

The naval nuclear program is widely acknowledged as having the most demanding academic program in the U.S. military. Sailors in the nuclear ratings account for just 3% of the enlisted Navy.

History of locations
After Admiral Rickover became chief of a new section in the Bureau of Ships, the Nuclear Power Division, he began work with Alvin M. Weinberg, the Oak Ridge National Laboratory (ORNL) director of research, to initiate and develop the Oak Ridge School of Reactor Technology (ORSORT) and to begin the design of the pressurized water reactor for submarine propulsion. Training for Fleet operators was subsequently conducted by civilian engineers at Idaho Falls, Idaho (1955-1958) and West Milton, New York (1955-1956). The first formal Nuclear Power School was established in New London, Connecticut in January 1956 with a pilot course offered for six officers and fourteen enlisted men. This school remained in use through Class 62-2 in 1962, after which the school was relocated to Bainbridge, Maryland.
 
Subsequent locations were United States Naval Training Center Bainbridge, Maryland (1962-1976); Mare Island Naval Shipyard, California (1958-1976); Naval Training Center Orlando, Florida (1976-1998) and its current location, Goose Creek, South Carolina. In 1986, Nuclear Field A School was established in Orlando to provide nuclear in-rate training to Sailors prior to attending Nuclear Power School.

In 1993, in response to the Base Realignment and Closure-directed closure of NTC Orlando by the end of Fiscal Year 1999, the Nuclear Field A School and Nuclear Power School were joined to create Naval Nuclear Power Training Command. A move from Orlando, Florida to Goose Creek, South Carolina began in May 1998 and was completed in January 1999. Construction of the new command allowed Nuclear Field A School and Nuclear Power School to be located in the same building.

Many improvements were added to the command to improve each sailor's quality of life and the effectiveness of training. The Bachelor Enlisted Quarters include microwaves and refrigerators along with semiprivate rooms joined by a common bath. The complex also includes a galley, recreation building, and recreation fields conveniently located for the sailors' use. At full capacity, the NNPTC complex can accommodate over 3,600 students and 480 staff members. Naval Health Clinic Charleston is located across NNPTC Circle from the NNPTC site and is a short walk from the main Rickover Center building.

Curriculum
The following topics are included in the curriculum for all program attendees:

Mathematics
Calculus-based physics
Fluid Dynamics
Applied Hydraulics
Nuclear physics
Electrical power theory and generating equipment
Nuclear reactor technology
Thermodynamics
Heat Transfer
Chemistry
Materials science and metallurgy
Health physics
Reactor principles
Reactor ethics

While both Enlisted and Officer courses of study include elements of all these topics, the officer course generally covers them in more depth, for example including a calculus-level mathematical examination of reactor dynamics. Additionally, whereas enlisted training focuses preferentially on each rating's specialty areas (though with significant cross-training in the other areas), the officer course covers all topics equally in depth. Though officer students preferably hold a degree in mathematics, engineering, physics, chemistry or other technical areas, the minimum requirement for officers to enter the program is a four year degree and successful completion of one year (two semesters or three quarters) each of Calculus and Calculus-based physics, regardless of whether the degree held required those courses or not. Such courses are already a requirement of Navy ROTC and Naval Academy programs, therefore it is entirely possible for Nuclear Field officers to "only" have a liberal arts degree prior to attending Nuclear Power School. Since all officer candidates for the program are personally interviewed at Naval Reactors Headquarters prior to acceptance to the program, candidates with "non-technical" degrees can be evaluated by headquarters staff during the interview process as to their suitability for the program.

Ted Carter, who attended the nuclear program after entering the carrier command track, said "that year and a half ... was probably the hardest I've ever worked in my life". It is widely acknowledged as having the most demanding academic program in the U.S. military. The school operates at a fast pace, with stringent academic standards in all subjects. Students typically spend 45 hours per week in the classroom, five days per week, and are required to log an additional 10 to 35 study hours per week outside classroom hours depending on their academic performance, either after weekday classroom hours or on the weekends. Because the classified materials are restricted from leaving the training building, students cannot study outside the classroom.

Students who fail tests and otherwise struggle academically are required to review their performance with instructors. The student may be given remedial homework or other study requirements. Failing scores due to personal negligence, rather than a lack of ability, can result in charges of dereliction of duty under the Uniform Code of Military Justice. Failing students may be held back to repeat the coursework with a new group of classmates, but such students are typically released from the Nuclear Power Program and are re-designated or discharged.

College credit (enlisted training)
The American Council of Education recommends an average of 60-80 semester-hours of college credit, in the lower-division baccalaureate/associate degree category, for completion of the entire curriculum including both Nuclear Field "A" School and Naval Nuclear Power School. The variation in total amount depends on the specific pipeline completed — MM, EM, or ET. Further, under the Servicemembers Opportunity Colleges degree program for the Navy (SOCNAV), the residency requirements at these civilian institutions are reduced to only 10-25%, allowing a student to take as little as nine units of coursework (typically three courses) through the degree-granting institution to complete their Associate in Applied Science degree in nuclear engineering technology or as much as 67 units to complete a bachelor's degree in Nuclear Engineering Technology or Nuclear Energy Engineering Technology.

The following select colleges offer college credit and degree programs to graduates of the U.S. Naval Nuclear Power School (NNPS):

Thomas Edison State University School of Applied Science and Technology Bachelor of Science in Applied Science and Technology (BSAST) Degree is designed for graduates of the U.S. Navy nuclear power program and degrees granted after October 2010 are accredited by the Technology Accreditation Commission (TAC) of the Accreditation Board for Engineering and Technology (ABET).
Old Dominion University's Batten College of Engineering & Technology offers a Bachelor of Science in Engineering Technology accredited by the Technology Accreditation Commission (TAC) of the Accreditation Board for Engineering and Technology (ABET). The Nuclear Engineering Technology Option of the Mechanical Engineering Technology major is a special program available to graduates of the U.S. Navy Nuclear Power School.,
Excelsior College School of Business and Technology's Bachelor of Science Nuclear Engineering Technology Degree. The Excelsior College baccalaureate degree program in nuclear engineering technology is also accredited by TAC of ABET.
Rensselaer Polytechnic Institute Department of Mechanical, Aerospace, and Nuclear Engineering, in cooperation with the Education for Working Professionals Office and the U.S. Navy, have developed undergraduate degree programs in nuclear engineering for graduates of the U.S. Navy Nuclear Power Training School.

College equivalence
The American Council on Education has evaluated the course of instruction at NNPTC and recommended the following credits be given for completion of the enlisted curriculum: Despite this, some universities do not give credit for NNPTC training.

5 hours in general physics
1 hour in heat transfer
3 hours in fluid dynamics
3 hours in nuclear reactor engineering
1 hour in atomic and nuclear physics
1 hour in radiation protection technology
3 hours in general chemistry
4 hours in technical mathematics
3 hours in industrial safety

Additionally, for Machinist's Mates
3 hours in applied thermodynamics
3 hours in power plant systems
2 hours in electricity basics

For Electronics Technicians and Electrician's Mates
3 hours in fluid power systems
4 hours in AC/DC circuits
2 hours in digital principles
2 hours in electric machines

The Catholic University of America offers graduate level credit for completion of the officer training course.

Nuclear Power Training Unit
The Navy operates two Nuclear Power Training Units (NPTU), where Nuclear Field program candidates continue their training following successful completion of Nuclear Power School.

Unlike the classroom and lab based courses of instruction at NPS (and Nuclear Field "A" School, for the enlisted operators), the NPTU course of instruction includes some initial classroom work prior to students going "in-hull" but is primarily conducted as hands-on training in an actual nuclear power plant. The plants operate on a 24-7 basis using five operating crews on a rotating shift-work schedule. Three of the crews are always on shift on any given day, each covering one of the days/swings/mids shifts. Each shift runs for seven days at which point that crew gets a rest period and then returns for the next shift in the cycle. While qualified staff members are generally only required to be onsite for their shift (plus some turnover time between shift sections), students are required to put in an additional "plus 4" of time on each shift, resulting in a 12 hour day. Additionally, each Monday through Friday a fourth crew is on a "Training Week" where they participate in classroom "continuous training" lectures and testing, provide qualification support to the students in the section, and also provide maintenance support to the on-shift Days crew as required. The fifth crew at any given point in the shift cycle is given time-off in between shift changeovers varying from 48 to 96 hours depending on which shift changeover they are going into.

The crews are primarily staffed by "sea-returnee" operators, themselves graduates of the Nuclear Power Program, who have successfully served several years on at least one tour at sea on a Navy nuclear vessel. NPTU students are divided up amongst the operating crews and get "checkouts" by staff operators on the specific aspects of the particular plant they are assigned to. The checkout phase progresses to each student standing numerous plant watches "under instruction" with a staff operator, and by their final watch are expected to fully accomplish all the duties of that watchstation with no assistance from the staff instructor, to include both routine plant operations and emergency response to real and simulated scenarios such as equipment malfunctions, fires, flooding, reactor accidents, etc. Upon successful completion of the watchstanding phase of instruction, each operator goes to a Final Oral Board where they will be given a comprehensive oral examination on all aspects of both NPS and NPTU courses of study by a senior Navy officer or nuclear qualified civilian and enlisted staff instructors. Officer candidate oral boards include a representative of Naval Reactors instead of enlisted staff. This oral examination typically lasts two to three hours. In addition to the oral examination, the members of the board conduct a review of all certification paperwork representing the student's successful completion of all requirements of the Program. Upon all board members agreeing that the candidate's level of knowledge was acceptable and all their paperwork complete, the candidate is certified as a qualified nuclear operator.

Nuclear Power Training Unit (NPTU) Charleston, SC is located at the former Naval Weapons Station Charleston. It is home to two decommissioned submarines which have been modified for training and are moored at piers in the Cooper River. The first two are ex- (MTS-626) and ex- (MTS-635). These moored training ships have their missile compartments removed, but have fully operational S5W reactor power plants. During that time, the submarine was cut into three pieces, and a portion of the hull was taken out. Three new hull sections from General Dynamics Electric Boat were added to accommodate the sub's new mission. A newly fabricated hull section was welded in place, containing training spaces, office spaces, and a Supplemental Water Injection System (SWIS) to provide emergency cooling water in the event of an accident. The MTS-701 is permanently moored at Nuclear Power Training Unit (NPTU) at Naval Support Activity Charleston in South Carolina. The MTS-701 arrived in Goose Creek via tug in late 2019 and has since been cleared for student training.

La Jolla is the first  to undergo the conversion to a training ship and will be followed by  about two years after, according to the Navy's long-range ship decommissioning plans.

All moored training ships are equipped with a diesel generator-powered Supplemental Water Injection System (SWIS) to provide emergency cooling water in the event of an accident.

NPTU Ballston Spa, which opened in 1957, is located at the Kenneth A. Kesselring Site Operation near Ballston Spa, New York. It is a subsidiary facility of Knolls Atomic Power Laboratory (KAPL), located about 30 minutes to the south. It is home to two land-based reactor prototypes. These are the MARF/S7G and the S8G Trident prototypes. The S8G plant was refueled with the S6W reactor core (for ) in the early 1990s, and the plant is currently (as of 2021) undergoing a third refueling with the Technology Demonstration Core (TDC). Though the MARF plant is scheduled to be decommissioned in the near future, the Navy is building a first-of-its-kind Engine Room Team Trainer at the site “which will use advance computer simulation coupled with an immersive learning environment to augment the training provided to sailors on the S8G Prototype's nuclear propulsion plant.” This Trainer will allow the training throughput of the site to be maintained at a high level even though only one prototype will remain in operation at the site. 
In the past two additional prototypes operated at the Site, D1G and S3G, but both have long since been decommissioned.

NPTU History
The Kesselring Site in New York has the longest operational history of the NPTUs. In 2012 it celebrated the 50,000th sailor qualified at the site. However, two other NPTU sites also provided operational training during the Cold War.

From the early 1950s to the mid-1990s, Naval Reactors Facility (NRF) in Idaho trained nearly 40,000 Navy personnel in surface and submarine nuclear power plant operations with three nuclear propulsion prototypes — A1W, S1W, and S5G.

From 1959 until 1993, over 14,000 Naval operators were trained at the S1C prototype at East Windsor, Connecticut.

References

Nuclear technology
Nuclear organizations
Educational institutions established in the 1950s
Military education and training in the United States
United States Navy schools and training
Education in Goose Creek, South Carolina